Suratagama is an extinct genus of agamid lizard known from the type species Suratagama neeraae from the early Eocene of India. It was named in 2013 on the basis of three isolated jaw bones from the Cambay Shale in Gujarat.

References 

Eocene lizards
Ypresian life
Eocene reptiles of Asia
Paleogene India
Fossils of India
Fossil taxa described in 2013